Wharemoa is a southeastern suburb of Greymouth on the West Coast of New Zealand. Marsden Road is a major road running through the suburb. Sawyers Creek runs northwest through the suburb to join the Grey River / Māwheranui near its mouth on the Tasman Sea.

Demographics

The statistical area of Marsden, which roughly coincides with Wharemoa, had a population of 1,221 at the 2018 New Zealand census, a decrease of 15 people (-1.2%) since the 2013 census, and an increase of 45 people (3.8%) since the 2006 census. There were 495 households. There were 603 males and 618 females, giving a sex ratio of 0.98 males per female. The median age was 38.6 years (compared with 37.4 years nationally), with 258 people (21.1%) aged under 15 years, 222 (18.2%) aged 15 to 29, 534 (43.7%) aged 30 to 64, and 207 (17.0%) aged 65 or older.

Ethnicities were 89.4% European/Pākehā, 12.0% Māori, 1.2% Pacific peoples, 4.2% Asian, and 3.7% other ethnicities (totals add to more than 100% since people could identify with multiple ethnicities).

The proportion of people born overseas was 13.8%, compared with 27.1% nationally.

Although some people objected to giving their religion, 50.1% had no religion, 40.3% were Christian, 1.2% were Hindu, 0.7% were Muslim, 0.2% were Buddhist and 2.7% had other religions.

Of those at least 15 years old, 168 (17.4%) people had a bachelor or higher degree, and 228 (23.7%) people had no formal qualifications. The median income was $34,400, compared with $31,800 nationally. The employment status of those at least 15 was that 501 (52.0%) people were employed full-time, 153 (15.9%) were part-time, and 27 (2.8%) were unemployed.

References

Grey District
Suburbs of Greymouth
Populated places in the West Coast, New Zealand